Joe Cipriano (October 27, 1931 – November 25, 1980) was an American college basketball coach, the head coach at independent Idaho (1960–63) and Nebraska (1963–80) of the Big Eight Conference.

Playing career
Born in Sumas in northwest Washington, he was an all-state guard known as "Slippery Joe" at Nooksack Valley High School in Whatcom County and graduated in 1949. "Jumping Joe" was an All-PCC guard in college under coach Tippy Dye at Washington in Seattle, and led the Huskies to a  record in his three years on the varsity. In his senior season, the energetic  and the Huskies advanced to the Final Four in March 1953 in Kansas City and finished third.

Assistant coach
After graduation, he was the freshman coach at Washington and later an assistant coach under Dye and Johnny Grayson.

Head coach

Idaho
At age 28, Cipriano became the head coach at the University of Idaho in May 1960. He succeeded Dave Strack, who left after a single season in Moscow to return to Michigan as the head coach. Cipriano's Vandal teams improved each year as an independent and went  in three seasons.

After the successful  season in 1962–63, Johnson turned professional and Cipriano moved east to Nebraska. The following season, the Vandals were fifth in the new six-team Big Sky Conference (4–6, 7–19 overall).

Nebraska
In March 1963, Cipriano became the head coach at the University of Nebraska in Lincoln, hired by his former mentor, Tippy Dye, who became the NU athletic director a year earlier (and hired head football coach Bob Devaney).

At the time of his retirement, he was far and away the winningest basketball coach in Nebraska history, with 168 more wins than any previous head coach, and one-fifth of the Cornhuskers' all-time wins in 83 years of play. He led the Huskers to the National Invitation Tournament (NIT) in 1967, the first postseason appearance in school history, with additional invites in 1978 and 1980. In his third year at Lincoln, the 1965–66 Huskers tallied the program's first 20-win season, runner-up to fourth-ranked Kansas (13–1) in the Big Eight at 12–2, handing the Jayhawks their sole conference loss, but did not garner a postseason bid. During this era, only the conference champion was guaranteed a berth in the 22-team NCAA tournament, and the NIT invited only fourteen.

Less than a year before his death, Cipriano returned to Moscow when his Huskers took on Don Monson's Vandals in the Kibbie Dome in early January. The two head coaches had played against each other 27 years earlier, as guards in the Pacific Coast Conference. Though it was played before classes resumed, it was the second-highest attendance for a basketball game to date on campus, in the Dome's fifth season.

Cipriano spent his final week at Bryan Memorial Hospital in Lincoln, and is buried at Lincoln Memorial Park in Lincoln.

Head coaching record

References

External links
The New York Times.com - Joe Cipriano's obituary

1931 births
1980 deaths
Amateur Athletic Union men's basketball players
American men's basketball players
Basketball coaches from Washington (state)
Basketball players from Washington (state)
Guards (basketball)
Idaho Vandals men's basketball coaches
Milwaukee Hawks draft picks
Nebraska Cornhuskers men's basketball coaches
People from Sumas, Washington
Washington Huskies men's basketball coaches
Washington Huskies men's basketball players